Phosphorene is a two-dimensional material consisting of phosphorus. It consists of a single layer of the artificially made layered black phosphorus, the most stable allotrope of phosphorus. The designation phosphorene has been introduced in analogy to the designation of  graphene as a single layer of graphite. Among two-dimensional materials, phosphorene emerged as a strong competitor to graphene because, in contrast to graphene, phosphorene has a nonzero fundamental band gap that can be furthermore modulated by strain and the number of layers in a stack. Phosphorene was first isolated in 2014 by mechanical exfoliation.

History 
In 1914 black phosphorus, a layered semiconducting allotrope of phosphorus, was synthesized. This allotrope has been shown to exhibit high carrier mobility. In 2014, several groups isolated single-layer phosphorene, a monolayer of black phosphorus. It attracted renewed attention because of its potential in optoelectronics and electronics due to its band gap, which can be tuned via modifying its thickness, anisotropic photoelectronic properties and high carrier mobility. Phosphorene was initially prepared using mechanical cleavage, a commonly used technique in graphene production that is difficult to scale up. Liquid exfoliation is a promising method for scalable phosphorene production.

Synthesis 

Synthesis of phosphorene is a significant challenge. Currently, there are two main ways of phosphorene production: scotch-tape-based microcleavage and liquid exfoliation, while several other methods are being developed as well. Phosphorene production from plasma etching has also been reported.

In scotch-tape-based microcleavage, phosphorene is mechanically exfoliated from a bulk of black phosphorus crystal using scotch-tape. Phosphorene is then transferred on a Si/SiO2 substrate, where it is then cleaned with acetone, isopropyl alcohol and methanol to remove any scotch tape residue. The sample is then heated to 180 °C to remove solvent residue.

In the liquid exfoliation method, first reported by Brent et al. in 2014 and modified by others, bulk black phosphorus is first ground in a mortar and pestle and then sonicated in deoxygenated, anhydrous organic liquids such as NMP under an inert atmosphere using low-power bath sonication. Suspensions are then centrifuged for 30 minutes to filter out the unexfoliated black phosphorus. Resulting 2D monolayer and few-layer phosphorene unoxidized and crystalline structure, while exposure to air oxidizes the phosphorene and produces acid.

Another variation of liquid exfoliation is "basic N-methyl-2-pyrrolidone (NMP) liquid exfoliation". Bulk black phosphorene is added to a saturated NaOH/NMP solution, which is further sonicated for 4 hours to conduct liquid exfoliation. The solution is then centrifuged twice, first for 10 minutes to remove any unexfoliated black phosphorus and then for 20 minutes at a higher speed to separate thick layers of phosphorene (5–12 layers) from NMP. The supernatant then is centrifuged again at higher speed for another 20 minutes to separate thinner layers of phosphorene (1–7 layers). The precipitate from centrifugation is then redispersed in water and washed several times by deionized water. Phosphorene/water solution is dropped onto silicon with a 280-nm SiO2 surface, where it is further dried under vacuum. NMP liquid exfoliation method was shown to yield phosphorene with controllable size and layer number, excellent water stability and in high yield.

The disadvantage of the current methods includes long sonication time, high boiling point solvents, and low efficiency. Therefore, other physical methods for liquid exfoliation are still under development. A laser-assisted method developed by Zheng and co-workers showed a promising yield of up to 90% within 5 minutes. The laser photon interacts with the surface of bulk black phosphorus crystal, causing a plasma and solvent bubbles to weaken the interlayer interaction. Depending on the laser energy, solvent (ethanol, methanol, hexane, etc.) and irradiation time, the layer number and lateral size of the phosphorene were controlled.

The high yield production of phosphorene has been demonstrated by many groups in solvents, but to realize the potential applications of this material, it is crucial to deposit these free-standing nanosheets in solvents systematically on substrates. H. Kaur et al. demonstrated the synthesis, interface-driven alignment and subsequent functional properties of few layer semiconducting phosphorene using Langmuir-Blodgett assembly. This is the first study which provides a straightforward and versatile solution towards the challenge of assembling nanosheets of phosphorene onto various supports and subsequently use these sheets in an electronic device. Therefore, wet assemblies techniques like Langmuir-Blodgett serves as a very valuable new entry point for the exploration of electronic as well as opto-electronic properties of phosphorene as well as other 2D layered inorganic materials.

It is still a challenge to directly epitaxially grow 2D phosphorene because the stability of black phosphorene is highly sensitive to substrate, which is understanding by theoretical simulations.

Properties

Structure 

Phosphorene 2D materials are composed of individual layers held together by van der Waals forces in lieu of covalent or ionic bonds that are found in most materials. There are five electrons on 3p orbitals of phosphorus atom, thus, giving rise to sp3 hybridization of phosphorus atom within phosphorene structure. Monolayered phosphorene exhibits the structure of a quadrangular pyramid because three electrons of P atom bond with three other P atoms covalently at 2.18 Å leaving one lone pair. Two of the phosphorus atoms are in the plane of the layer at 99° from one another, and the third phosphorus is between the layers at 103°, yielding an average angle of 102°.

According to density functional theory (DFT) calculations, phosphorene forms in a honeycomb lattice structure with notable nonplanarity in the shape of structural ridges. It is predicted that crystal structure of black phosphorus can be discriminated under high pressure. This is mostly due to the anisotropic compressibility of black phosphorus because of the asymmetrical crystal structures. Subsequently, the van der Waals bond can be greatly compressed in the z-direction. However, there is a great variation in compressibility across the orthogonal x-y plane.

It is reported that controlling the centrifugal speed of production may aid in regulating the thickness of a material. For example, centrifuging at 18000 rpm during synthesis produced phosphorene with an average diameter of 210 nm and a thickness of 2.8 ± 1.5 nm (2–7 layers).

Band gap and conductivity properties 

Phosphorene has a thickness dependent direct band gap that changes to 1.88 eV in a monolayer from 0.3 eV in the bulk. Increase in band gap value in single-layer phosphorene is predicted to be caused by the absence of interlayer hybridization near the top of the valence and bottom of the conduction band. A pronounced peak centered at around 1.45 eV suggests the band gap structure in few- or single-layer phosphorene difference from bulk crystals.

In vacuum or on weak substrate, an interesting reconstruction with nanotubed termination of phosphorene edge is very easy to happen, transforming phosphorene edge from metallic to semiconducting.

Air stability

One major disadvantage of phosphorene is its limited air-stability. Composed of hygroscopic phosphorus and with extremely high surface-to-volume ratio, phosphorene reacts with water vapor and oxygen assisted by visible light to degrade within the scope of hours. Through the degradation process, phosphorene (solid) reacts with oxygen/water to develop liquid phase acid 'bubbles' on the surface, and finally evaporate (vapor) to fully vanish (S-B-V degradation) and severely reducing overall quality.

Applications

Transistor 
Researchers have fabricated transistors of phosphorene to examine its performance in actual devices. Phosphorene-based transistor consists of a channel of 1.0 μm and uses few layered phosphorene with a thickness varying from 2.1 to over 20 nm. Reduction of the total resistance with decreasing gate voltage is observed, indicating the p-type characteristic of phosphorene. Linear I-V relationship of transistor at low drain bias suggests good contact properties at the phosphorene/metal interface. Good current saturation at high drain bias values was observed. However, it was seen that the mobility is reduced in few-layer phosphorene when compared to bulk black phosphorus. Field-effect mobility of phosphorene-based transistor shows a strong thickness dependence, peaking at around 5 nm and decrease steadily with further increase of crystal thickness.

Atomic layer deposition (ALD) dielectric layer and/or hydrophobic polymer is used as encapsulation layers in order to prevent device degradation and failure. Phosphorene devices are reported to maintain their function for weeks with encapsulation layer, whereas experience device failure within a week when exposed to ambient condition.

Battery electrode 
Phosphorene is considered a promising anode material for rechargeable batteries, such as Lithium-ion batteries. The interlayer space allows lithium storage and transfer. The layer number and lateral size of phosphorene affect the stability and capacity of the anode.

Inverter 
Researchers have also constructed the CMOS inverter (logic circuit) by combining a phosphorene PMOS transistor with a MoS2 NMOS transistor, achieving high heterogeneous integration of semiconducting phosphorene crystals as a new channel material for potential electronic applications. In the inverter, the power supply voltage is set to be 1 V. The output voltage shows a clear transition from VDD to 0 within the input voltage range from −10 to −2 V. A maximum gain of ~1.4 is attained.

Solar-cell donor material (optoelectronics) 
The potential applications of mixed bilayer phosphorene in solar-cell material was examined as well.

Flexible circuits 

Phosphorene is a promising candidate for flexible nano systems due to its ultra-thin nature with ideal electrostatic control and superior mechanical flexibility. Researchers have demonstrated the flexible transistors, circuits and AM demodulator based on few-layer phosphorus, showing enhanced am bipolar transport with high room temperature carrier mobility as high as ~310 cm2/Vs and strong current saturation. Fundamental circuit units including digital inverter, voltage amplifier and frequency doubler have been realized. Radio frequency (RF) transistors with highest intrinsic cutoff frequency of 20 GHz has been realized for potential applications in high frequency flexible smart nano systems.

See also 
 Borophene
 Germanene
 Graphene
 Silicene
 Stanene

References

Phosphorus
Semiconductor materials
Emerging technologies
Monolayers